The Servientrega Championship was a golf tournament on the Web.com Tour. It was first played in March 2015 at the TPC Cartagena in Cartagena, Colombia.

Winners

Bolded golfers graduated to the PGA Tour via the Web.com Tour regular-season money list.

References

External links
Coverage on the Web.com Tour's official site
TPC Cartagena at Karibana

Former Korn Ferry Tour events
Golf tournaments in Colombia
Sport in Cartagena, Colombia
Recurring sporting events established in 2015
2015 establishments in Colombia